William Middleton Tennent (6 October 1845 – 5 July 1883) was an English cricketer active in 1867 who played for Lancashire. He was born in Hobart and died in Hastings. He appeared in one first-class match, scoring three runs.

Notes

1845 births
1883 deaths
English cricketers
Lancashire cricketers